Melanophidium khairei or Khaire's black shieldtail is a species of burrowing snake of the family Uropeltidae, endemic to India.

The species was named after the herpetologist Neelimkumar Khaire.

References

Uropeltidae
Endemic fauna of India
Reptiles described in 2016